West Union is an extinct town in Cass County, in the U.S. state of Missouri.

West Union was platted in 1872.  A post office called West Union was established in 1871, and remained in operation until 1903.

References

Ghost towns in Missouri
Former populated places in Cass County, Missouri